Mario Parial (August 13, 1944 – December 22, 2013) was a multi-awarded Filipino painter, printmaker, sculptor and photographer. His works have been sold at Sotheby's.

About
Mario Parial was born on August 13, 1944 in Nueva Ecija. One of the fourteen children of Fidel Parial and Aurora Agustin. He studied grade school at the Pura V Kalaw Elementary School,  graduated in 1958. In 1963, he graduated from the Roosevelt Memorial School in Quezon City where he was the editor of Duplex, the Campus paper. In 1964, he learned printmaking under Manuel Rodriguez Senior, the father of Print Making in the Philippines. In 1967, he began the year with a job with FairAds Inc located in Escolta, Manila. In 1969, he graduated from the University of Santo Tomas, Bachelor of Fine Arts Major in Advertising. In 1969, he joined the Faculty of the University of Santo Tomas to teach painting, printmaking and photography. In 1970, he married Carina Claro with whom he has 2 Children, namely, Kristine born in 1971 and Mikel Parial (Also a Painter, Printmaker and Photographer) born in 1972. His classmates, five of them formed the PENTA GROUP an advertising group and Mario was one of the graphic designer.. He also had a brief stint teaching art at the University of the Philippines. He died on December 22, 2013 due to cancer.

Awards
3rd Prize for a Stained Glass Design, 1963, UST Annual Art Competition
4th Prize for Flying Figures, 1964, Quezon City Arts Festival
1st Honorable mention, "The Fire Is Over," 1965, 15th SNSAC Sculpture Category
Honorable Mention, 1965, UST Annual Art Competition
First Prize for "Flight in the Sun" 1966, 1st (AAP)Art Association of the Philippines Graphic Arts
First Prize for "The World Has Many Faces," 1966, 16th SNSAC Sculpture Category
Certificate of merit, "Once Upon A Construction," 1966, 16th SNSAC Sculpture Category
Certificate of merit, "Night Flight," 1966
1st Prize for "Moriones", 1967, PAL Art Competition
2nd Prize, 1967, UST Students Annual
Certificate of Merit, "Hour After Hour", 1967, 17th SNSAC Graphic Arts Category
4th Prize, 1968, UST Photo Contest
2nd Prize, 1968, PAP Annual
Honorable Mention, 1968, PAP Annual
Benavides Award for Outstanding Performance to University Prestige from the University of Santo Tomas, 1967.
2nd Prize, 1970, PAP Annual
Thirteen Artists Awardee of the Cultural Center of the Philippines, 1972.
Outstanding Thomasian Award from UST, 1978.
Critic's Choice Awardee, 1978

Shows
One-Man Show, 1965, AAP Series of New Talents 10
One-Man Show, 1975, Galerie Bleue, Makati
One-Man Show, 1976, "Halaman", Metro Gallery, Makati
One-Man Show, 1977, Galerie Bleue, Makati
One-Man Show, 1978, ABC Galleries, Manila
One-Man Show, 1979, Heritage Art Center, Quezon City
One-Man Show, 1980, Ma-Yi Associates Gallery, Makati
One-Man Show, 1980, CCP Small Gallery, Manila
One-Man Show, 1982, Hiraya Gallery, Manila
One-Man Show, 1993, Manila Peninsula, Makati
One-Man Show, 1996, Shangri-La Edsa Plaza Mall, Mandaluyong
One-Man Show, 1997, Asian Images, Phil. Consulate N.Y.
One-Man Show, 1998, Casa Victoria,New Jersey
One-Man Show, 1998, "Afternoon Mood", Gallery Nouveau, Mandaluyong
One-Man Show, 1998, "Parial In Davao", GenLuna Gallery, Davao City
One-Man Show, 1999, "Mahal Na Birhen", Gallery 828, Mandaluyong
One-Man Show, 2000, "Parial Lithographs", Boston Gallery, Quezon City
One-Man Show, 2000, Philippine Consulate, San Francisco, USA
One-Man Show, 2000, Casa Victoria, New Jersey, USA
One-Man Show, 2001, "Marikina and Antipolo:Landscapes", Blind Tiger Cafe, Quezon City
One-Man Show, 2004, "Pagdiriwang", Galerie Joaquin-Podium, Mandaluyong
One-Man Show, 2005, "Pasasalamat", Galerie Joaquin-Main, San Juan, Metro Manila,
One-Man Show, 2008, "Festivo", Galerie Joaquin-Main, San Juan, Metro Manila.
One-Man Show, 2009,"Bountiful Harvest",Galerie Raphael, Taguig
One-Man Show, 2009," The Peripatetic Process of Parial's Painted Photographs", Kaida Art Gallery
One-Man Show, 2010, "Legacy", Galerie Joaquin, at Podium
One-Man Show, 2011," Majore", Galerie Joaquin, Mandaluyong
One-Man Show, 2013, "The Peripatetic Process of Parial's Painted Photographs 2" Galerie Francesca, Megamall

Group and Foreign Shows
1966, Twenty Years of Philippine Art, Luz Gallery
1966, Philippine Prints, Taiwan
1969, Annual Shows, Luz Gallery
1972, Thirteen Artist Exhibit, CCP
1979, Museum Artists, Museum of the Philippines
1980, Museum Artists, Museum of the Philippines
1980, Philippine Paintings, China
1981, China Selection, Art Association of the Philippines
1983, ASEAN Show, CCP
1985, Prints Show, Bonn, Germany
1992, Tribute to Amorsolo, University of the Philippines
1994, Filipino Exhibit, China Club, Hong Kong
1994, Singapore Impression's, Robinson's Galleria, Singapore
1994, Philippines 2000 Travelling Exhibition, USA
1994, "Lines and Colors", Penang, Malaysia
1994, ASEAN Exhibition, Jakarta, Indonesia
1997, Philippine Center Gallery, New York, USA
1997, Mississauga, Ontario, Canada
1999, "Reunion of Thirteen Artists", CCP
1999, Group Show, Metropolitan Gallery
1999, "Limbag Sining", PAP, CCP
1999, Group Show, Museo Pambata, Manila
1999, Print Show, Museo Iloilo, Iloilo
2000, "Philippine Images", Philippine Consulate, San Francisco, USA

Published works
The 1980 Mobil Art Awards by Alice Guillermo, pp 64–67
Contemporary Philippine Art by Manuel Duldulao, Sr.
The Struggle for Philippine Art by Purita Kalaw Ledesma and Amadis Ma. Guerrero
A Century of Realism in Philippine Art by Manuel Duldulao, Jr.
Filipino Nudes by Alfredo Roces
Okir by Leonides Benesa
Cultural Center of the Philippines Annual Book, 1978–1982
25 Years of Philippine Printmaking, Museum of Philippine Art
Art Philippines, The Crucible Workshop
Miracles of Mary, BlackBerry Press Inc., Harper Collins Publishing Co., New York, USA

Parial on Philippine Stamps
On 28 November 2005, a Set of 4 Stamps and a Souvenir Sheet was issued for the National Stamp Collecting Month. One of the Stamps featured a Print by Mario Parial, a Rubber Cut, titled "BULBS" The Denomination was P6.00 and 140,000 of this were only issued.

Parial at Sothebys
3 Mario Parial Paintings have been sold at Sothebys. Nine Fishes done in 2005 and measures 16x36 Inches and sold at Sothebys Singapore on October 9, 2005. Blessings II sold on April 29, 2007 at Sothebys Singapore and Eight Horses sold on Oct 22,2006 at Sothebys Singapore.

References
 Endaya, Imelda Cajipe (artist and independent curator) and Cecilia B. Rebong (Philippine Consul-General).  "Pamana: Modernong Sining" (A Heritage of Modern Art), An Art Exhibit from the Collection of the Philippine Center in New York, Printed Catalogue, The Consulate General of the Philippines, Philippine Center Management Board, and PCGNY.net, June 11, 2007
 Duldulao, Manuel D. "Twentieth Century Filipino Artists" Legacy Publishers, Quezon City. 1995.

External links
Mario Parial Website
Mario Parial Redux
Mario Parial on Artnet
Mario Parial on AskArt
Mario Parial's Good Fortune (Article in Malaya)
Mario Parial's Thankful Art (Article in Inquirer)

1944 births
2013 deaths
Filipino painters
People from Nueva Ecija
University of Santo Tomas alumni
Academic staff of the University of Santo Tomas